Croatian Minute Movie Cup is the longest running international film festival in Croatia, held every year in Požega. The festival began in 1993.

Between 1993, when the festival began, and 2015, more than 5000 films from 79 countries were submitted.

Sources

External links 
 

Minute Movie Cup
Short film festivals
Recurring events established in 1993
1993 establishments in Croatia
Minute Movie Cup